Milton Schwebel (May 11, 1914 – October 3, 2013) was an American psychologist known for his pioneering work in peace psychology. This included research on the psychological effects of fear of nuclear war. He was a faculty member at the School of Education at New York University for eighteen years, where his positions included professor and department chair. He later taught at Rutgers University, where he served as dean of the Graduate School of Education for ten years. He was a founder of the American Psychological Association (APA)'s Division 48, the Society for the Study of Peace, Conflict, and Violence, and the founding editor-in-chief its official journal, Peace and Conflict: Journal of Peace Psychology. He was also the founding chair of the APA's Advisory Committee on Impaired Psychologists.

References

1914 births
2013 deaths
20th-century American psychologists
People from Troy, New York
Columbia University alumni
Steinhardt School of Culture, Education, and Human Development faculty
Rutgers University faculty
Academic journal editors
Peace psychologists
21st-century American psychologists